Prasophyllum robustum, commonly known as the robust leek orchid, is a species of orchid endemic to Tasmania. It has a single tubular, green leaf and up to thirty greenish-brown flowers with a white labellum. It is only known from a single population of about fifty plants, its numbers having been reduced by land clearing.

Description
The edges of the outer part of the labellum have crinkled or wavy edges and there is a raised, fleshy, green, channelled callus in its centre and extending to the bend. Flowering occurs in November and December.

Taxonomy and naming
The robust leek orchid was first formally described in 1940 by William Henry Nicholls who gave it the name Prasophyllum patens var. robustum from a specimen collected at Smithton. The description was published in The Victorian Naturalist. In 1998, Mark Clements and David Jones raised the variety to species status. The specific epithet (robustum) is a Latin word meaning "hard and strong like oak".

Distribution and habitat
Prasophyllum robustum grows with shrubs and grasses in forest. It is only known from a single population of about fifty plants and the Smithton population appears to be extinct. Other populations have been lost due to land clearing for agriculture.

Conservation
The only remaining population of P. robustum is on private property with the current owners taking steps to preserve the species. Potential threats include land clearing, grazing by horses and inappropriate fire regimes.

References

External links 
 

robustum
Flora of Tasmania
Endemic orchids of Australia
Plants described in 1940